Hippocampus slovenicus is an extinct species of seahorse found in 2005 in the coprolitic horizon of the Tunjice hills Lagerstätte in Slovenia along with remains of the related species Hippocampus sarmaticus. The horizon dates 13 million years back to the lower Sarmatian during the middle Miocene period, making the two species the earlier known seahorse fossils in the world. The remains consist mostly of juvenile specimens and of head and backbones of adults. H. slovenicus had a narrow head with a long snout about 50% HL with 11 trunk rings and a short tail 50% more of body with 25-26 tail rings and an extremely long dorsal fin base. Hippocampus slovenicus had numerous small black spots of pigment all over the body.

The animals are believed to have lived among seagrasses and macroalgae in the temperate shallow coastal waters of the western part of the central Paratethys.

References

Further reading
 Choi C. (May 4, 2009) "PHOTOS: Oldest Seahorses Found; Help Solve Mystery." National Geographic news.
 Žalohar J. Fossil seahorses  - treasure from the ancient seas.

slovenicus
Miocene fishes of Europe
2005 in science
Fossil taxa described in 2009
Neogene fish of Europe
Prehistoric fish